Blanco, California may refer to:
Blanco, Monterey County, California
Blanco, Tulare County, California